Bahia frog may refer to:

 Bahia forest frog (Macrogenioglottus alipioi), a frog in the family Odontophrynidae endemic to the Atlantic Forest of southeastern Brazil
 Bahia heart-tongued frog (Phyllodytes melanomystax), a frog in the family Hylidae endemic to Brazil
 Bahia lime tree frog (Sphaenorhynchus bromelicola), a frog in the family Hylidae endemic to Bahia, Brazil
 Bahia snouted tree frog (Scinax strigilatus), a frog in the family Hylidae endemic to Brazil
 Bahia yellow frog (Stereocyclops histrio) a frog in the family Microhylidae endemic to the Atlantic forest in Bahia, Brazil

Animal common name disambiguation pages